Karel Finek (27 May 1920 in Hradec Králové–8 September 1989) was a Czech footballer and football manager.

He played for SK Baťov, Slavia Prague and Saint-Étienne. He capped twice for Czechoslovakia.

He coached Cracovia, Śląsk Wrocław, Slavia Prague, Wisła Kraków, Garbarnia Kraków, SpVgg Weiden and FC Amberg.

References

1920 births
1989 deaths
Czech footballers
Czechoslovak footballers
Czechoslovakia international footballers
Czechoslovak expatriate footballers
Expatriate footballers in France
SK Slavia Prague players
AS Saint-Étienne players
Ligue 1 players
Czech football managers
Czechoslovak football managers
SK Slavia Prague managers
MKS Cracovia managers
Wisła Kraków managers
Sportspeople from Hradec Králové
Expatriate football managers in Poland
Czechoslovak expatriate sportspeople in Poland
Czechoslovak expatriate sportspeople in France
Czechoslovak expatriate sportspeople in West Germany
Expatriate footballers in West Germany
Śląsk Wrocław managers
Association football goalkeepers
FC Amberg managers
Czech expatriate football managers